Pasumpon Muthuramalinga Thevar college, also known as P.M.T. College, is a general degree college located in Sankarankovil, Tirunelveli district, Tamil Nadu. It was established in the year 1977. The college is affiliated with Manonmaniam Sundaranar University. This college offers different courses in arts, commerce and science.

Departments

Science
Chemistry
Mathematics
Zoology

Arts and Commerce
Tamil
English
History
Commerce

Accreditation
The college is  recognized by the University Grants Commission (UGC).

References

External links
http://pmtcollege.in/

Colleges affiliated to Manonmaniam Sundaranar University
Universities and colleges in Tirunelveli district